Niagara Falls, Ontario is the principal tourist city in the Niagara Region of Ontario. The tallest building in the city is the 58-storey,  Hilton Niagara Falls Tower 2, Most of the buildings are hotels because Niagara Falls Ontario is a major tourist city for its unobstructed view of both the Horseshoe Falls and American Falls.

The latest development that is under consideration in Niagara Falls is the Comfort Suites Hotel. At  and 28 floors the building  will be the first major tower built in the 2010s decade. , there are only 2 high-rises proposed for construction in Niagara Falls.

Tallest buildings
This list ranks buildings in Niagara Falls that stand at least 30 m (98 ft) tall, based on CTBUH height measurement standards. This includes spires and architectural details but does not include antenna masts. Freestanding observation and/or telecommunication towers, while not habitable buildings, are included for comparison purposes; however, they are not ranked. One such tower is the Skylon Tower.

See also

 List of tallest buildings in Canada
 List of tallest buildings in Ontario
 Canadian architecture

References

External links
 Emporis.com
  

Buildings and structures in Niagara Falls, Ontario
Niagara Falls
Tallest buildings in Niagara Falls